Mohamad Khasseri bin Othman is a former Malaysian Paralympian who won a bronze medal at the 1992 Paralympic Games in Barcelona.

References

External links
 

Paralympic athletes of Malaysia
Paralympic bronze medalists for Malaysia
Year of birth missing (living people)
Malaysian male high jumpers
Medalists at the 1992 Summer Paralympics
Malaysian Muslims
Malaysian people of Malay descent
Track and field athletes with disabilities
Visually impaired high jumpers
Paralympic high jumpers
Paralympic medalists in athletics (track and field)
Athletes (track and field) at the 1992 Summer Paralympics